The Song of Hate is a lost 1915 silent film drama directed by J. Gordon Edwards and starring Betty Nansen. It was produced and distributed by Fox Film Corporation. Rex Ingram wrote the script.

Cast
Betty Nansen - Floria Tosca
Arthur Hoops - Baron Scarpia
Dorothy Bernard - The spy's lover
Claire Whitney - The spy's sister

See also
1937 Fox vault fire
La Tosca (1918 film)

References

External links
 The Song of Hate at IMDb.com

1915 films
Lost American films
American black-and-white films
Fox Film films
Films directed by J. Gordon Edwards
Films based on operas
American silent feature films
Silent American drama films
1915 drama films
1915 lost films
Lost drama films
Films based on La Tosca
1910s American films
1910s English-language films